József Magasföldi (born 10 November 1984 in Székesfehérvár) is a retired Hungarian football striker.

He has played for Videoton FC, BFC Siófok, MFC Sopron, Budapest Honvéd FC and Paksi SE in Hungary and FC Slovan Liberec in Czech Republic. In February 2020, 35-year old Magasföldi retired.

References

External links
 HLSZ 
 MLSZ 
 Profile 
 

1984 births
Living people
Sportspeople from Székesfehérvár
Hungarian footballers
Association football forwards
Fehérvár FC players
FC Slovan Liberec players
FC Sopron players
Budapest Honvéd FC players
BFC Siófok players
Zalaegerszegi TE players
Paksi FC players
Gyirmót FC Győr players
Puskás Akadémia FC II players
Nemzeti Bajnokság I players
Nemzeti Bajnokság III players
Hungarian expatriate footballers
Expatriate footballers in the Czech Republic
Hungarian expatriate sportspeople in the Czech Republic
Nemzeti Bajnokság II players